The 1986–87 IHF Women's Cup Winners' Cup was the eleventh edition of IHF's competition for European women's handball national cup champions.

Kuban Krasnodar defeated 1977 and 1979 champion Berliner TSC in the final, becoming the first Soviet team to win the Cup Winners' Cup. Semifinalist Chimistul Râmnicu Vâlcea ended a 5-year period of Yugoslav hegemony in the competition beating ŽRK Voždovac in the quarterfinals.

Results

References

Women's EHF Cup Winners' Cup
1986 in handball
1987 in handball